Guraleus wilesianus is a species of sea snail, a marine gastropod mollusk in the family Mangeliidae.

Description
The length of the shell attains 10 mm, its diameter 3 mm.

(Original description) The shell has the same characteristics as in Guraleus costatus, but it is more slender in contour, and develops spiral striae on the intercostal spaces of the upper whorls.

Distribution
This marine species is endemic to Australia and can be found off South Australia.

References

 Cotton, B. C. (1947). Australian Recent and Tertiary Turridae. Field Naturalist's Section of the Royal Society of South Australia Conchology Club Publication. 4: 1–34.

External links
  Tucker, J.K. 2004 Catalog of recent and fossil turrids (Mollusca: Gastropoda). Zootaxa 682:1–1295.

wilesianus
Gastropods described in 1922
Gastropods of Australia